Stoneville is a suburb east of Perth in the Shire of Mundaring, Western Australia. It is named after Edward Albert Stone, who was Chief Justice of Western Australia when the place was named in 1905. The name was chosen by the local residents, who were developing the district for fruit growing. The town's population is 2,050, with a median age of 36 years and 7.1% of residents aged over 65.

In a bushfire in January 2014 a considerable number of houses were destroyed.

In 2019 local residents resorted to activism in a bid to stop the proposed North Stoneville SP34 development in favour of more sustainable housing. External studies have shown existing road infrastructure can only cater for approx 70 more dwellings and main roads have confirmed there are no upgrades planned for this area intersecting  Great Eastern Highway. A special councillors meeting was held in August, at which the Mundaring Shire unanimously rejected the proposal.   the final decision sits with the Western Australian Planning Commission.

References

Further reading

External links
 Stoneville on Geoscience Australia
 Mundaring and Hills Historical Society website

Suburbs and localities in the Shire of Mundaring
Suburbs of Perth, Western Australia